Tim Farron succeeded Nick Clegg as Leader of the Liberal Democrats on 29 July 2015, unveiling his Frontbench Team shortly afterwards. Farron conducted his first reshuffle on 28 October 2016. A second reshuffle was conducted on 8 May 2017. In July of the same year Farron resigned and was succeeded by Sir Vince Cable.

Liberal Democrat Frontbench Team (2015-2017)
Frontbench Team of Tim Farron

References

See also
Cabinet of the United Kingdom
Official Opposition Shadow Cabinet (UK)

Politics of the United Kingdom
Liberal Democrats (UK) frontbench team